Buzz is a South Korean band best known for its emotional rock ballads. The group, which debuted in 2003, currently consists of members Yoon Woo-hyun (Guitarist), Min Kyung-hoon (Main Vocalist), Son Sung-hee (Guitarist), Kim Ye-joon (Drummer), and Shin Joon-ki (Bassist).

Buzz's song "Gliding" (활주) was used as the Korean opening to the popular Japanese anime, Naruto.
Their song "Fighting Spirit" (투지) was also used as another Korean opening to Naruto.

In July 2007, the band officially went on hiatus as four of the band members began, or had already begun, to serve the 26 month mandatory service in the South Korean Army required of all South Korean men. Min Kyung-hoon, the vocalist of the group proceeded in a solo career while the anticipated fourth album was due to be completed once the band completed their duties. A new vocalist, Na Do-Kyun, was auditioned at a later stage. After Na left the group, he debuted with HISTORY, a male group under LOEN Entertainment that has since disbanded.

Buzz's major success in 2006 was marked by three of the band's songs reaching the MTV-Korea top 10 list in a mere week, consecutively- "My Love," "My Darling," and "남자를 몰라" (You don't know men). In addition, the song "은인" (Savior) made it to the top 14 list.

History

Forming process 

In 1998. Buzz began its formation after guitarist Son Sung-hee heard of drummer Kim Ye-jun was popular for playing the drums at Sangmun High School although dance music had been dominating the Korean music scene with the advent of Seo Tai-ji and Boys in 1992. 

After a year, Son and Kim joined Aiwon Entertainment and was suggested to fill the rest of the band. After some time, Son and Kim met with the Yun Woo-Hyun, who signed the contract with Aiwon Entertainment before the two. Eventually, Aiwon Entertainment hired Shin Jun-ki and Min Kyung-hoon. 

In 2000, the pop-rock band Buzz was formed, a band formed by the long-activated youths in the underground market who all had the wish to perform in a band.

2003–2007: Debut and successful first albums
Buzz made their official debut with the album "Morning Of Buzz" on October 11, 2003. Following their debut album, Buzz's second album, "Buzz Effect", was released on March 3, 2005. It contains several songs, such as "Coward", "Thorn" and "Travel to me". In their third album "Perfect", the song "You Don't Know Men" was well received. On May 17, 2007, Buzz disbanded temporarily due to the members' military service. Min was confirmed to continue solo activities while the members are serving the military. On June 25, 2007, Buzz released their last single, "Love Is My Heart, Part 2".

2014–present
On April 8, 2014, following the members' discharge from military service, Buzz announced their comeback. Through the digital singles "Summer of the Eight Years" and "Train", Buzz demonstrated the change of musical style over the years. On November 26, 2014, Buzz's 4th album "Memorize" was released.

In 2017, Buzz released their first mini album "Be One". The title song, "The Love" ("사랑하지 않은 것처럼") charted very well on Korean music charts and its music video on YouTube has reached 12 million views as of date.

On December 14, 2018, Buzz released their second mini album "<15>", with the title song "척" ("Missing you"). On December 12, 2019, Buzz released a new single for Christmas called "Christmas Song".

On March 10, 2021, they comeback with their third mini album "The Lost Time" (잃어버린 시간).

Members 

 Current

Personal life
Yoon Woo-hyun married Rumble Fish's vocalist, Choi Jin Yi (최진이), on March 26, 2017. The two composed the theme song, called "Season of Love 사랑의 계절" for the SBS drama 《장옥정, 사랑에 살다》(Jang Ok-jung, Living by Love) together.

Son Sung-hee married with a non-celebrity on May 13, 2017 in Gangnam, South Korea.

Son Sung-hee and Shin Joon-ki organized the rock band "4th FLOOR".

Discography

Studio albums

Extended plays

Singles

Awards

References

External links 
 Official Website
 Buzz in empas people
 https://web.archive.org/web/20050914133316/http://rki.kbs.co.kr/english/enter/music_artists_detail.htm?No=10343
 https://web.archive.org/web/20060111002423/http://english.kbs.co.kr/entertainment/news/1364533_11858.html

South Korean pop rock music groups
Musical groups established in 2003
Musical groups disestablished in 2008
K-pop music groups
MAMA Award winners